The Women's 50 kg competition at the 2021 World Karate Championships was held from 17 to 20 November 2021.

Results

Finals

Repechage

Top half

Section 1

Section 2

Bottom half

Section 3

Section 4

References

External links
Draw

Women's 50
2021 in women's karate